Ripley is an unincorporated community in Franklin Township, Pulaski County, in the U.S. state of Indiana.

History
Ripley was founded in 1900.

Geography

References

Unincorporated communities in Pulaski County, Indiana
Unincorporated communities in Indiana